Gushan is a railway and light rail station in Gushan District, Kaohsiung, Taiwan served by Taiwan Railways and the Circular Line of the Kaohsiung rapid transit system.

History

Around the station
 Zhongdu Wetlands Park

See also
 List of railway stations in Taiwan

References

2018 establishments in Taiwan
Railway stations in Kaohsiung
Railway stations served by Taiwan Railways Administration
Transport infrastructure completed in 2018